The Nyika burrowing shrew (Myosorex gnoskei) is a species of mammal in the family Soricidae found in Malawi.

References

Myosorex
Mammals described in 2008
Endemic fauna of Malawi